Prince Umberto of Savoy (22 June 1889 – 19 October 1918) was a member of the Aosta branch of the House of Savoy and was styled the Count of Salemi.

Early life

Umberto was born in Turin, the fourth son of Prince Amadeo of Savoy, Duke of Aosta, the only one  by his second wife and niece Princess Maria Letizia Bonaparte (1866–1926) the daughter of Prince Napoléon and Princess Maria Clotilde of Savoy. His father, a former king of Spain, died when he was just a year old. He had three older half-brothers: the Duke of Aosta, the Count of Turin and the Duke of the Abruzzi.

In 1908 Umberto began studies at the Naval Academy in Livorno. In May 1911, while still at the academy, he was accused of theft. His cousin King Victor Emmanuel III of Italy wanted him arrested, but his mother took him to Turin and challenged the king to carry out the arrest. In July Victor Emmanuel ordered that he be detained at the Castle of Moncalieri and then spend eighteen months aboard a man-of-war, during which time a Carabinieri colonel would act as his tutor and keeper.

First World War and death
During the First World War Umberto volunteered to serve in the Royal Italian Army. He joined the army as a lieutenant and served in a Catania cavalry regiment. During the war he was awarded a silver medal for bravery displayed while acting as a bombing officer.

Umberto died a month before the end of the war.  The official court bulletin recorded that he was killed in action, but in fact he was a victim of the 1918 influenza pandemic.  He was buried in the cemetery of Crespano del Grappa.  In 1926 his remains were moved to the Sacrario Militare del Monte Grappa.

Ancestry

References

1889 births
1918 deaths
House of Savoy
Italian military personnel killed in World War I
Italian princes
Italian Roman Catholics
Deaths from Spanish flu
Nobility from Turin
Sons of kings